UT.no is a Norwegian trip planning website. The site is a joint undertaking between Norwegian Trekking Association and Norwegian Broadcasting Corporation, and was launched on 23 October 2009.

The site has information about hiking, skiing, sightseeing trips, amongst others.

A mobile application for iPhone and Android was launched in 2012, with maps and descriptions of hikes and cottages.

See also
Norwegian Trekking Association
Norwegian Broadcasting Corporation

References 

Tourism in Norway
Hiking trails in Norway
NRK